Women's football most often refers to:
 Women's association football (women's soccer).

Women's football may also refer to:

 Women's gridiron football
 Women's Australian rules football
 Ladies' Gaelic football
 Women's rugby league
 Women's rugby union (Women's rugby links here)